Ashraf Marwan (‎, 2 February 1944 – 27 June 2007) was an Egyptian billionaire who worked as a spy for Israeli Mossad.

Egyptian officials claim he was a double agent who also worked for them.

From 1969, Marwan worked at the Presidential Office, first under Gamal Abdel Nasser and then as a close aide to his successor, Anwar Sadat. In 2002, it became known that Marwan was recruited by Egyptian Intelligence and may have fed the Israeli Mossad with misleading information during the period leading up to the 1973 Arab-Israeli War. Marwan's name surfaced in the Suisse secrets revelations, as he had been able to open a Credit Suisse bank account in 2000, even though he was a politically exposed person. He died under mysterious circumstances in June 2007, falling from the balcony of his London house. His wife and relatives testified that prior to his death, he expressed concerns that he was being followed. His wife accused the Mossad of the assassination.

Early life and education
Marwan was born in Egypt on February 2, 1944. His grandfather was the chief of the Sharia courts in Egypt, and his father, a military officer, reached the rank of General in the Egyptian Republican Guard. In 1965, at the age of 21, Marwan graduated Cairo University with a degree in chemical engineering and was conscripted into the army. That same year he met Mona Nasser, the president's second daughter, who was 17 at the time. She fell in love with him, but her father suspected that Marwan's interest in his daughter stemmed more from her political status than her personal charms. Marwan agreed to the marriage, which took place in July 1966, under her pressure.

In 1968 Marwan started working in the Presidential Office under Sami Sharaf, Nasser's aide-de-camp and the strongman of the Egyptian security service, who kept an eye on him. In late 1968 Marwan, Mona, and their new-born son, Gamal, left for London, allegedly for the continuation of Marwan's studies. A few months later, the young couple was ordered by Nasser, who was irritated by information concerning their lavish lifestyle, to return to Egypt, where Marwan continued working under Sami Sharaf.

Career 
Marwan's service at the Presidential Office lasted eight years (1968–1976). Although he only held a junior position under Nasser, the president occasionally used him for delicate missions, such as calming the crisis that erupted after General Saad el-Shazly's resignation from the army in response to his rival's nomination as chief of staff. After Nasser's death in September 1970, Marwan became a close aide to Sadat, who needed him by his side in order to demonstrate that he had the support of Nasser's family. Before the 1973 Arab-Israeli War, Marwan's skills caught the attention of Sadat, who nominated him to be in charge of foreign relations. In his new capacity, Marwan developed excellent relations with the Saudi and the Libyan leaderships, who supplied Egypt with critical financial and military assistance. He played a major role in persuading Saudi Arabia and other Gulf countries of the Organization of Petroleum Exporting Countries (OPEC) to impose an oil embargo against the United States, to retaliate for the U.S. decision to re-supply the Israeli military, and to gain leverage in the post-war peace negotiations. The embargo triggered the 1973 oil crisis in the US, whose domestic oil output had already peaked by 1969, and was one of the causes of the 1973-1975 recession. Sadat, who recognized Marwan's brilliance, recruited him to lead negotiations with Libya to obtain Mirage-5 aircraft, considered critical for the coming war against Israel. Marwan managed the Libyan-Egyptian deal, which was followed by leveraging his status in Sadat's eyes and among Arab countries.
Marwan started to increasingly deal with international arms trade, which helped him to build his wealth. In 1981, he bought heavy weapons from the US to supply an Arab country. However, the weapons were intended for Palestinian militias in Lebanon.

Lead up to the 1973 Arab–Israeli War 
Egypt had begun preparing a war with the aim of retaking the Sinai Peninsula, which it had lost to Israel during the Six-Day War in 1967. Marwan's unparalleled access to his nation's best-kept secrets, especially after his promotion in May 1971, allowed him to provide Israel with information about the coming war, including the full Egyptian war plans, detailed accounts of military exercises, original documentation of Egypt's arms deals with the Soviet Union and other countries, the Egyptian military Order of Battle, the minutes from meetings of the high command, accounts of Sadat's private conversations with other Arab leaders and even the minutes of secret summit meetings in Moscow between Sadat and Soviet leader Leonid Brezhnev.

The information that Marwan provided made its way to the desks of Israeli Prime Minister Golda Meir, Defense Minister Moshe Dayan, and Israeli Defense Force Chief of Staff Chaim Bar-Lev in raw form. It shaped Israel's strategic and tactical approach to Egypt and provided a direct look at Egypt's war calculus, including Sadat's minimal requirements for launching a war: mainly long-range attack aircraft and Scud missiles, without which Egypt could not have overcome Israeli air superiority.

The 1973 Arab–Israeli War 
In April 1973, Marwan persuaded the Mossad that Egypt planned to attack in mid-May. Consequently, Israel raised its state-of-military readiness, but the war did not come. In October, he persuaded the Mossad of another plan to attack by deliberately feeding them misleading information. Eli Zeira, Director of Aman and Israel's military intelligence during the 1973 Arab-Israeli War, said that the Israeli Agranat Commission, which investigated Israeli leaders for the reasons behind their failure in the war, said that Marwan, who was known by many nicknames, conveyed misleading information to Israel, under the direction of Egyptian president Anwar Sadat, to earn their trust. According to the Israeli Agranat Commission, "The Concept" states that "Egypt will only attack, if the war is carried out in partnership with Syria, with modern aircraft and other weapons that guarantee Egyptian superiority over the Israeli air force." "How can such a senior Egyptian official come to the Israeli embassy in London in broad daylight, while he and his leaders know that this embassy, like other Israeli embassies abroad, is being monitored by dozens of intelligence agencies around the world?" Zeira questioned.

In autumn 1973, Sadat decided to launch a war without waiting for the arms that had been his precondition, and Egypt accelerated its war preparations. Marwan reported on Sadat's decision and the military preparations for war but expressed his opinion that, ultimately, Egypt would be deterred from militarily challenging Israel. Israeli military intelligence leaders, including Eli Zeira, due to the May false alarm, refused to accept the evidence of numerous warnings and indicators that the Arabs planned to attack. Accordingly, Israel was caught by surprise in the 1973 Arab-Israeli War.

Postwar 
In an interview, Marwan's son, Gamal Marwan, stated that Israel became aware that Marwan misled them, causing their biggest loss in terms of in deaths, casualties and weapons, since 1948. According to the White House military briefing and The Yom Kippur War by Abraham Rabinovich, Israeli casualties were 2,800 dead, 8,800 wounded and 293 captured.

Secretary to the President of the Republic for Foreign Relations 
On 14 February 1974, Marwan became Secretary to the President of the Republic for Foreign Relations, a new position that reflected Sadat's ruling style. Given Sadat's dissatisfaction with the conduct of his foreign minister, Ismail Fahmy, Marwan was considered as a candidate to replace him.

By that stage, however, Marwan had accumulated a considerable number of personal enemies, who accused him of using his closeness to Sadat to gain personal wealth. When the accusations gained momentum, Sadat had to yield to the pressure and, in March 1976, ended Marwan's service in the Presidential Office.

Arab Organization for Industrialization 
Marwan was nominated to head the Arab Organization for Industrialization, an arms production complex in Cairo that was financed by Saudi Arabia, the UAE, and Qatar. Following additional political pressures, Sadat had to relieve him from that position in October 1978.

Business 
Following Sadat's assassination in October 1981, Marwan left Egypt and started a business career in London. He gained a reputation as a mysterious man, who did not play according to the rules of the City. He was involved in the failed attempt by Tiny Rowland to take over the House of Fraser, a group of department stores, whose jewel in the crown was Harrods, where the English aristocracy used to shop. Marwan amassed significant wealth, the source of which has never been disclosed. 

In 1995, during a dispute for control of Chelsea FC between the sitting chairman Ken Bates and Matthew Harding, it was revealed in the media that Marwan owned 1.5 million shares at the club.

In 2000, Marwan had opened a Credit Suisse bank account, even though he clearly was a politically exposed person; this became known as part of the Suisse secrets revelations.

Marwan worked closely with the Egyptian intelligence who implanted Marwan as a double agent using a traditional Russian tactic in which the agent feeds his victim with 95 percent of accurate information and at the critical moment, conveys the false data.
Yuri Bar Yosef, Professor of Political Science at the University of Haifa published a book, which was produced into a movie, entitled "The Angel." The book confirmed that Marwan was a double agent who collected information for Israel, but was formerly working for Egypt.
In 2022 Liwa Mohammed Rashad, equivalent to major general, in Western terms.  Disputes the claim that Marwan was a double agent.  

Some Israeli officials refused to accept the fact that he was playing the Mossad into his hands and claim that Marwan worked for the Mossad only, however, some evidence is to the contrary of this claim. An Israeli author in 2002 was one of those false claims Ahron Bregman. However, Eli Zeira, the director of Israel's Military Intelligence in 1973, said that the Israeli Agranat Commission, which investigated Israeli leaders for the reasons behind their failure in the war, said that Marwan conveyed accurate information to Israeli intelligence only to deceive them and earn their trust. Some believe Zeira, was acting out of jealousy for his failed role to take Marwan's allegation serious.  Marwan reported to the Mossad that Israel would be attacked.  Zeira ignored the warnings and later claimed the timing of the attack was incorrect.  None the less Israel was attacked as Marwan stated.

Personal life and death
Marwan married Mona Abdel Nasser in the 1960s. One of Marwan's sons was married to the daughter of former Arab League Secretary General Amr Moussa. His son, Gamal, is a close friend of Gamal Mubarak, the son of former Egyptian President Hosni Mubarak.

Marwan died on 27 June 2007 outside his flat in Carlton House Terrace, London. The cause of death was traumatic aortic rupture following a fall from the balcony of his fifth-floor apartment. News reports indicate that the Metropolitan Police Service increasingly believe Marwan was murdered, a belief also held by Marwan's elder son, Gamal. Marwan's funeral in Egypt was led by Egypt's highest-ranked religious leader, Muhammad Sayyid Tantawy, and attended by, amongst others, Gamal Mubarak, son of the former (then current) Egyptian President Hosni Mubarak, and intelligence chief Omar Suleiman. According to President Mubarak, "Marwan carried out patriotic acts which it is not yet time to reveal." Following a case review in January 2008, the investigation was transferred to the Metropolitan Police Specialist Crime Directorate, both because of its public nature and because the shoes Marwan was wearing when he fell, key evidence in the case, had been lost. One witness, who was on the third floor of a nearby building, told police that he saw two men "wearing suits and of Mediterranean appearance" appear on the balcony moments after Marwan's fall, look down, and then return inside the apartment. Police are also reported to have lost Marwan's shoes, which could hold clues on whether or not Marwan jumped from the balcony.

Marwan is the fourth Egyptian of note to die in London in a similar manner. The others, all of whom were involved in Egyptian politics between 1966 and 1971, are actress Suad Hosni; Egyptian ambassador to Greece Al-Leithy Nassif; and Ali Shafeek, secretary in the office of former Egyptian Vice President Abdel Hakim Amer.

At the time of the investigation, Marwan's wife said she believed that Mossad was behind his death. However, an analysis in The Guardian found this scenario to be unlikely: "For one thing, killing a former agent after his name is revealed would seem to be a major disincentive for new recruits. Even if Israel believed that Marwan was a double agent, working for the Egyptians, better to do nothing and, through their silence, imply he was faithful to their cause." Further, Marwan was at least the third Egyptian living in London to die under similar circumstances, all of whom had ties with the Egyptian security services.

Egyptian journalist Amr Ellissy conducted an investigation into Marwan's death for his documentary series Ekhterak, broadcast on Egyptian television in six episodes on the first anniversary of Marwan's death. Ekhterak was filmed in Marwan's London apartment and included interviews with his son, a witness, and acquaintances of Marwan. Ellissy published his book The Agent Babel in Arabic through Dar Al Shorouq press, and it was launched on 2 February 2009.

The British magazine Private Eye also followed the story closely and suggested that there was considerable cause for suspicion surrounding the circumstances of Marwan's death.

Legacy 
Ahron Bregman published in 2016 a book on his relationship with Marwan called The Spy Who Fell to Earth. In 2017, Salon Productions purchased the rights to turn the book into a feature documentary. This feature documentary, also entitled The Spy Who Fell to Earth, was directed by Thomas Meadmore and released by Netflix in 2019.

Professor Uri Bar-Joseph wrote a book published in 2016, The Angel: The Egyptian Spy Who Saved Israel, later used as the basis of a Netflix film, The Angel. Bar-Joseph's book addresses whether Marwan was a genuine spy or a double agent. In a review of the book in the CIA's Studies in Intelligence, Thomas G. Coffey states that it persuasively "argues that the nature of the intelligence Marwan gave the Israelis was simply too destructive of Egyptian interests" for Marwan to have been a double agent and that it offers "a convincing defense" against the claim that the intelligence he provided was "late, flawed, and of little practical use".

References

1944 births
2007 deaths
20th-century Egyptian businesspeople
Egyptian billionaires
2007 in London
Murder in London
Egyptian murder victims
Deaths from falls
2007 murders in the United Kingdom
Egyptian spies
Deaths by defenestration